The Peripatos is an ancient pathway that girds the Acropolis in Athens  and intersects with the Panathenaic way on the north slope. It connects the shrines that are interspersed around the Acropolis hill. A reading of Thucydides 2.17, which records that the shrines were erected within an area which it was forbidden to build or quarry called the Pelasgian ground, suggests that the peripatos follows the line of the archaic and now vanished Pelasgic wall.

An inscription on a boulder of acropolis limestone from the north slope of the hill is the only epigraphic evidence of the pathway. It reads "Length of the Peripatos: five stades and eighteen feet." This inscription is dated to the fourth century BCE, though it is possible that the path had been cleared and in use at least since the Periklean building programme by when the cave sanctuaries had been established. Pausanias in the second century CE makes mention of using the road to examine the klepsydra and the Apollo cave.

Work was undertaken to restore the Peripatos beginning in 1977.

See also 

 Landscaping of the Acropolis of Athens

Notes

Bibliography
R. E. Wycherley, The Stones of Athens, 1978.
J. M. Camp. The Archaeology of Athens, 2001.
J. Travlos, Pictorial dictionary of Ancient Athens, 1970.
Weibke Friese, On the Peripatos: Accessibility and Topography of the Acropolis Slope Sanctuaries in Ascending and descending the Acropolis: Movement in Athenian Religion, edited by Wiebke Friese, Soren Handberg, Troels Myrup Kristensen, 2019.

Landmarks in Athens
Ancient Greek buildings and structures in Athens
Monuments and memorials in Greece
Late Classical Greece